Francis Blundell may refer to:

Sir Francis Blundell, 3rd Baronet (1643–1707), Irish MP for King's County
Francis Blundell (politician) (1880–1936), British MP for Ormskirk